Căldăraru is a commune in Argeș County, Muntenia, Romania. It is composed of three villages: Burdea, Căldăraru and Strâmbeni.

References

Communes in Argeș County
Localities in Muntenia